I Just Want My Pants Back is an American comedy-drama that premiered with a special sneak peek on August 28, 2011 on MTV, with the series airing the new episodes beginning on February 2, 2012. The series is based on David J. Rosen's 2007 novel of the same name.

On May 16, 2012, MTV canceled the series.

Synopsis
The series follows the life of a group of twenty-somethings as they try to get through life as best they can in Brooklyn.

Cast
 Peter Vack as Jason Strider, a young Jewish twenty-something trying to juggle sex, love, career and friendship out of college.
 Kim Shaw as Tina, Jason's best friend
 Elisabeth Hower as Stacey, Eric's college sweetheart. She's studying to be a lawyer
 Jordan Carlos as Eric, Stacey's college sweetheart. He's studying to be a medical doctor
 Sunkrish Bala as Bobby, the owner of the local bodega.

Recurring cast
 Chris Parnell as J.B. Jason's no-nonsense boss at the casting agency
 Nick Kocher as Lench
 Kelli Barrett as Jane
 Steve Talley as Brett
 Stephanie Brait as Ness

Guest stars
 Mela Hudson, Bartender
 Ashley Austin Morris, Jocoby
 Billy Keenly, Chunky
 Reza Garakani, Brian
 Zack Robidas, Meyers

Production
The series is based on David J. Rosen's 2007 novel I Just Want My Pants Back. The pilot was written by David J. Rosen and directed by Doug Liman. The series is executive produced by Rosen, Liman and Dave Bartis with Universal Cable Productions and Hypnotic. It is also co-executive produced by Gene Klein.

Peter Vack, Elisabeth Hower, Jordan Carlos, Kim Shaw were cast as the four leads, Jason, Stacey, Eric and Tina. Production on the half-hour pilot began in New York City on September 3, 2010.

On January 14, 2011, MTV ordered the pilot to series of 12 episodes, with production started on the rest of the season in June 2011. A sneak peek of the pilot episode aired on August 28, 2011, following the 2011 MTV Video Music Awards and averaged 5.1 million viewers and a 4.9 P12-34 rating. The series began the rest of season one on February 2, 2012, following Jersey Shore. The re-airing of the pilot on February 2, 2012, pulled in 1.81 million viewers and a 1.0 rating.

Episodes

References

External links

2010s American comedy-drama television series
2011 American television series debuts
2012 American television series endings
English-language television shows
MTV original programming
2010s American sex comedy television series
Television series by Universal Content Productions
Television shows set in New York City
Television shows filmed in New York (state)
Television shows based on American novels